The South American hoary bat (Aeorestes villosissimus) is a species of vesper bat found in South America.

Taxonomy
Prior to 2015, the South American hoary bat was recognized as a subspecies of the hoary bat, A. cinereus.

Range
The South American hoary bat is found in the following South American countries: Peru, Bolivia, Paraguay, Uruguay, Brazil, and Argentina.

References

Lasiurini
Bats of South America